Warmed Omari (born 23 April 2000) is a French professional footballer who plays as a defender for Ligue 1 club Rennes.

Career
Omari is a youth academy graduate of Rennes. On 9 June 2020, he signed his first professional contract with the club. He signed a three-year contract extension on 27 April 2021, which tied him to the club until June 2024. On 15 August 2021, he made his professional debut in a 1–1 league draw against Brest. Omari scored his first goal for Rennes in a 1–0 Coupe de France win over Lorient on 18 December 2021.

Personal life
Born in Mayotte, Omari is also eligible to represent Comoros in international football.

Career statistics

References

External links
 
 

2000 births
Living people
Association football defenders
French footballers
Mayotte footballers
French sportspeople of Comorian descent
Ligue 1 players
Championnat National 3 players
Stade Rennais F.C. players